Route 145 is a  circuitous south–north urban state highway in Massachusetts. It is entirely within Suffolk County and primarily serves the peninsular town of Winthrop from East Boston and Revere. Its southern terminus is at Route 1A in East Boston and its northern terminus is at Route 16 in Revere.

Route description

Although it is officially a south–north highway, Route 145 travels in each of the four main compass directions at some point along its route. Route 145 begins at the intersection of Neptune Road and Bennington Street in East Boston, just after the point where the Mass Pike/I-90 ends and merges with Route 1A. An access road from Route 1A junction travels a short distance on Neptune Road to Bennington Street, with a right turn onto Bennington Street marking the beginning of Route 145. Route 145 travels northeast along this major arterial street to the Orient Heights neighborhood and then bears right along Saratoga Street at Orient Heights Square. The route continues along Saratoga Street east until crossing into Winthrop over a bridge at Belle Isle Inlet. 

Route 145 travels a short distance down Main Street in Winthrop before turning right and traveling nearly due south along Pleasant Street. This residential section of Winthrop features Donovan's Beach which offers a view of the Boston skyline looking west-southwest across Logan Airport. Pleasant Street continues south then bears left a few times before becoming Washington Avenue, where Route 145 travels east to meet Veterans Road. At this intersection, Route 145 heads north along Veterans Road while traffic heading for Point Shirley and Deer Island continues to Shirley Street. Along Veterans Road the route heads north through Winthrop and then bears left at the intersection with the north end of Winthrop Shore Drive to become Crest Avenue and then Revere Street, heading generally northwest. 

Leaving Winthrop, Route 145 enters Revere and is called Winthrop Parkway, which travels north along the Atlantic Ocean past Revere's Beachmont neighborhood and meets Revere Beach Parkway at Eliot Circle. From the circle Route 145 travels south then west as the beginning of the westbound parkway.

History
Modern Route 145 was first commissioned between 1954 and 1956 as Route 45.  The route was renumbered to 145 in 1958.

Major intersections

References

External links

Winthrop, Massachusetts
Revere, Massachusetts
East Boston
145
Streets in Boston
Transportation in Suffolk County, Massachusetts